Li Haoran (born 12 January 1993) is a Chinese footballer who plays for China League One side Inner Mongolia Zhongyou.

Club career 
Li Haoran started his professional football career in 2015 when he joined China League One side Hebei China Fortune. On 8 July 2015, he made his senior debut in the fourth round of 2015 Chinese FA Cup with a 2–1 home defeat against Jiangsu Sainty. He made his league debut for Hebei on 26 July 2015 in a 6–1 home win against Qingdao Hainiu, coming on as a substitute for Abdurahim Laajab in the 75th minute. Li followed Hebei promote to the first tier in 2016 and played two FA Cup matches in the 2016 season. On 5 March 2017, he made Super League debut in the first match of the season which Hebei tied with Henan Jianye 0–0, coming on for Ezequiel Lavezzi in the 90th minute.

Career statistics 
.

References 

Living people
1993 births
Association football midfielders
Chinese footballers
Footballers from Hebei
Hebei F.C. players
Chinese Super League players
China League One players